Nevada City Jewish Cemetery is a no longer active Jewish cemetery founded in 1854 by the Nevada Hebrew Society, and located in Nevada City, Nevada County, California. The last burial was during the summer of 1890. There are only 29 headstones that are visible. On October 29, 1972, the site was dedicated as a historical site. 

It is priavtely operated by the Commission for the Preservation of Pioneer Jewish Cemeteries and Landmarks in the West and is not open to the public.

History 
The Nevada City Jewish Cemetery was founded in 1854 by the Nevada Hebrew Society. The first burial was Caroline Himes who died in July 19, 1856. The last burial happened in the summer of 1890, with the death of Louis W. Dreyfuss in July 22, 1890.

In 1962, the Commission for the Preservation of Pioneer Jewish Cemeteries and Landmarks in the West was formed to help with education, and restoration for all of the Jewish cemeteries in Gold County. In 1964, the cemetery was restored after many months of work by the Commission for the Restoration of Pioneer Jewish Cemeteries; led by Mel Altman of Sacramento, and Rabbi Nathaniel Simkind of Richmond.

On October 29, 1972, the site was rededicated as a historical site. Congregation B’naim Harim of Grass Valley oversees the weekly upkeep of the cemetery.

Related cemeteries 
Other 19th-century Jewish cemeteries in Northern California are located at:
 Jackson Pioneer Jewish Cemetery (or Givoth Olam), Jackson, Amador County
 Grass Valley Pioneer Jewish Cemetery (or Shaar Zedek), Grass Valley, Nevada County
 Sonora Hebrew Cemetery, Sonora, Tuolumne County
 Placerville Pioneer Jewish Cemetery, Placerville, El Dorado County
 Marysville Hebrew Cemetery, Marysville, Yuba County
 Mokelumne Hill Pioneer Jewish Cemetery, Mokelumne Hill, Calaveras County
 Jewish Cemetery, Shasta, Shasta County

See also 
 Birth of a Community: Jews and the Gold Rush (1994 film)
 Hebrew Cemetery
 List of cemeteries in California
 Judah L. Magnes Museum

References 

Jewish cemeteries in California
Cemeteries in California
History of Nevada City, California
1854 establishments in California
Cemeteries in Nevada County, California